A canoe is a light narrow boat, pointed at both ends, propelled with a paddle.

Canoe may also refer to:
 Kayak in the United Kingdom

 Canoeing, a paddle sport

Geography

Australia
 Canoe Reach (Brisbane River), a reach of the Brisbane River in Queensland

Canada
 Canoe, British Columbia, in the city of Salmon Arm
 Canoe Bay, British Columbia, in the district municipality of North Saanich
 Canoe Bay, Ontario, in Kenora District, Ontario
 Canoe Bay Channel, in Greater Sudbury, Ontario
 Canoe Cove, Prince Edward Island, in the township Lot 65
 Canoe Creek (volcano), a volcano in British Columbia
 Canoe Creek Indian Reserve No. 1, an Indian Reserve in British Columbia, Canada
 Canoe Creek, Ontario, in Parry Sound District, Ontario
 Canoe Cut, Ontario, in Muskoka District Municipality, Ontario
 Canoe Lake 165, Saskatchewan, an Indian Reserve
 Canoe Lake, Nova Scotia, on  Cape Breton Island
 Canoe Lake, Ontario (disambiguation), the name of numerous locations in the province
 Canoe Lake, Saskatchewan, at Cole Bay, Saskatchewan
 Canoe Narrows, Saskatchewan, in the Canoe Lake 165 Indian Reserve
 Canoe Narrows, Ontario, in Kenora District, Ontario
 Canoe Pass, British Columbia, in the district municipality of Delta, British Columbia
 Canoe Point, Ontario, in Algoma District, Ontario
 Canoe River (British Columbia)

United States
 Canoe, Alabama
Canoe, Kentucky
 Canoe Brook, a tributary of the Passaic River in New Jersey
 Canoe Creek State Park, a state park in Pennsylvania
 Canoe Township, Indiana County, Pennsylvania

Other uses
Canoe.com, a Canadian web portal
Dragging Canoe, a Cherokee (American Indian) war leader
John Canoe, a ritual once common in coastal North Carolina, and still practiced in some parts of the Caribbean 
Canoe plants, plants taken from ancient Polynesia and transplanted to several different islands in the Pacific
CANoe, a Controller Area Network (CAN) software development tool
 Canoe Bar and Restaurant, a high end restaurant located on the 54st floor of the Toronto Dominion Centre
CANOE, an acronym for the Big Five personality traits

See also
 Outline of canoeing and kayaking
 Canoo, German-American manufacturer of electric vehicles
 Canu